L'Abergement-de-Cuisery is a commune in the Saône-et-Loire department in Bourgogne-Franche-Comté in eastern France.

Geography
The commune lies in the south of the department in the Saône valley, across the Saône from Mâcon, the prefecture of the department.

Population

See also
Communes of the Saône-et-Loire department

References

Communes of Saône-et-Loire